Untamed China with Nigel Marven is British six-part nature documentary series presented by Nigel Marven and made by Image Impact and WonderVision Pictures for television channels Animal Planet and CITVC China in 2011. In each episode, Marven explores selected part of China, searches for animals there and meets the local people.

DVD release 
The series was released on DVD 16 April 2012 by Safecracker Pictures.

Links 
 The series info on Fremantle Brand

Documentary films about nature
Animal Planet original programming
Television series about China
2011 British television series debuts
2011 British television series endings